Gianmaria is the name of:

 Gianmaria Bruni (born 1981), Italian racing driver
 Gianmaria Dal Maistro (born 1980), Italian skier
 Gianmaria Potenza (born 1936), Italian artist
 Gianmaria Testa (1958–2016), Italian singer-songwriter and guitarist
 Gianmaria Zanandrea (born 1999), Italian footballer
 Gianmaria (singer), Italian singer-songwriter and rapper.

See also
 Giammaria, given name
 Jean-Marie, given name

Italian masculine given names